Valeriy Yuriovych Kureliekh (born 12 August 1991 in Kremenchuk, Poltava Oblast, Ukrainian SSR) is a Ukrainian football defender currently playing for Ukrainian Second League club FC Kremin Kremenchuk.

Club history
Kureliekh is the product of the Sportive School of Kremin Kremenchuk.

Valeriy Kureliekh began his football career in Kremin-91 in Kremenchuk. He signed with FC Kremin Kremenchuk during the 2008 summer transfer window.

He made his debut for the main FC Vorskla team as a substitute in the second half in a match against Karpaty Lviv in the Ukrainian Premier League on 1 December 2012.

Career statistics

References

External links
  Profile – Official Kremin site
  FC Kremin Kremenchuk Squad on the PFL website
 Profile at Official FC Vorskla Site
 

1991 births
Living people
Ukrainian footballers
Association football defenders
FC Kremin Kremenchuk players
FC Vorskla Poltava players
FC Hirnyk-Sport Horishni Plavni players
Ukrainian Premier League players
Ukrainian Second League players
People from Kremenchuk
Sportspeople from Poltava Oblast
21st-century Ukrainian people